Ola Kala (Everything's Fine) is the eighth studio album and first international album featuring a number of English language songs by popular Greek singer-songwriter Sakis Rouvas, originally released on June 16, 2002, in Greece and Cyprus by Minos EMI. International songwriter and producer Desmond Child is the main producer of the album. The album was certified Gold eleven days after its release in Greece, while it eventually was certified Platinum shortly after.

Track listing

Original release

† "Tha Erthi I Stigmi", written by Natalia Germanou, is a Greek version of the song "Taste the Tears", originally released by Jason Raize and composed by Diane Warren
†† "Pou Tha Pas", written by Natalia Germanou, is a Greek version of the song "World of Make Believe", released by 3rd Faze and composed by Desmond Child

Re-release and international release

† In some markets: 
"Tha Erthi I Stigmi", the Greek version of the song "Taste the Tears" originally released by Jason Raize and composed by Diane Warren, is replaced by his English cover of "Taste the Tears"
"Pou tha Pas", the Greek version of the song "World of Make Believe" released by 3rd Faze and composed by Desmond Child, is replaced with his English cover of "World of Make Believe"

French release

† "Feelings" is a cover of the 1975 Morris Albert song
†† "Dis Lui" is a cover of the 1975 Mike Brant song, which is a French adaptation of "Feelings"
††† A 2003 Ola Kala international reissue was made available in some markets to include "Dis lui" and "Feelings" as bonus tracks

European re-release

† Tracks 14–16 are taken off the next Greek album To Hrono Stamatao
†† Shake it is taken off the CD Single of same name

Singles and music videos
The album produced three music videos all by French directors.

"Disco Girl"
"Disco Girl", released on December 17, 2001, was the first single from the album. It was released as a CD single with one remix and a promotional CD was also available with three additional remixes. The music video of the song was directed by Antonin Bonnet & Tanguy Dairaine and first appeared in Greece under the original release. The video was filmed in Cape Town, South Africa.

"Ola Kala"
The music video for "Ola Kala" was shot in Montreal, directed by Xavier Gens and produced by the Bullring Production company.

"Dis lui"
"Dis lui" was shot in Southern France, directed by Xavier Gens and produced by the Bullring Production company. It was released in France and the "Dis lui" video was used for the English language cover of the original song, "Feelings", which was released internationally. It was also used for the Greek version entitled "Pes Tis", penned by Aris Davarakis, which appeared later that year as a single from the album To Hrono Stamatao.

Release history

Charts
The album certified gold in Greece eleven days after its release, and later was certified Platinum.  The album has not received any certifications abroad.

References

External links
 Sakis Rouvas' official website
 IFPI Greece official website with Greek charts

2002 albums
2003 albums
2004 albums
Albums produced by Desmond Child
Albums produced by Phoebus (songwriter)
Greek-language albums
Minos EMI albums
Sakis Rouvas albums